The 2010 Davis Cup (also known as the 2010 Davis Cup by BNP Paribas for sponsorship purposes) was the 99th edition of the most important annual tournament among national teams in men's tennis worldwide. In the dramatic final, Serbia defeated France 3–2 to win its first Davis Cup title.

The draw for the World Group, Zonal Groups I and Zonal Groups II took place in Geneva on 23 September 2009. The competition started with the first round on 5–7 March.

On 6–8 March 2010 Novak Djokovic played the key role in bringing Serbia to the World Group quarterfinals for the first time in its independent history, winning both singles matches in the home tie against the United States (against Sam Querrey and John Isner). Later, Serbia progressed to the Davis Cup final, following the victories over Croatia (4–1) and Czech Republic (3–2). Serbia came from 1–2 down to defeat France in the final tie 3–2 in Belgrade to win the nation's first Davis Cup championship. In the final, Djokovic scored two singles points for Serbia, defeating Gilles Simon and Gaël Monfils, while the last match was won by Viktor Troicki, who beat Michaël Llodra.

Serbia became the 13th nation in history to win the Cup, which was passed to them from the previous year's winner Spain. France missed the opportunity to win its 10th title and surpass Great Britain in total number of titles won. The Serbian team celebrated the trophy by fulfilling their bet to shave their hair off in case of victory.

World Group

Draw
The draw for the 2010 World Group was held in Geneva on 23 September 2009.

First round losers played in World Group play-offs.

Final

World Group play-offs

 Date: 17–19 September

The eight losing teams in the World Group first round ties, and eight winners of the Group I second round ties competed in the World Group play-offs.

Seeded teams
 
 
 
 
 
 
 
 

Unseeded teams

 
 
 
 
 
  
 
 

Americas Zone

Group I

Seeds:
  (promoted to World Group Playoffs)
  (promoted to World Group Playoffs)

Remaining nations:

Draw

Group II

Seeds:
 
 
 
 

Remaining nations:

Draw

Group III

 
 
  – relegated to Americas Zone Group IV in 2011
 
  (withdrew)
  – promoted to Americas Zone Group II in 2011
 
  – promoted to Americas Zone Group II in 2011

Group IV

  – promoted to Americas Zone Group III in 2011
  – promoted to Americas Zone Group III in 2011

Asia/Oceania Zone

Group I

Seeds: 
1. 
2. 
3. 
4. 

Remaining nations:

Draw

Group II

Seeds:
 
 
 
 

Remaining nations:
 
 
  Pacific Oceania

Draw

Group III

  – relegated to Asia/Oceania Group IV
  – promoted to Asia/Oceania Group II
 
 

 
   – promoted to Asia/Oceania Group II
 

 Withdrawn:  – relegated to Asia/Oceania Group IV

Group IV

 
 
 
  – promoted to Asia/Oceania Group III
 

 
 
  – promoted to Asia/Oceania Group III

Europe/Africa Zone

Group I

Seeds:
 
 
 
 

Remaining nations:

Draw

Group II

Seeds:
 
 
 
 
 
 
 
 

Remaining nations:

Draw

Group III Europe

 
 
 
 
  – promoted to Europe/Africa Zone Group II
 

  – promoted to Europe/Africa Zone Group II

Group III Africa

 
 
 
 
 
 
 

 
 
  – promoted to Europe/Africa Zone Group II
 
 
  – promoted to Europe/Africa Zone Group II

References

External links

Seeds announced for the 2010 draw
Official site

 
Davis Cup
Davis Cups by year